Michael Augustine may refer to:

 Michael Augustine (bishop) (1933–2017), Indian Catholic archbishop of the Roman Catholic Archdiocese of Pondicherry and Cuddalore
 Michael Augustine (footballer) (born 1992), Nigerian footballer playing for the New England Revolution